Bicinchoninic acid  is a weak acid composed of two carboxylated quinoline rings.

Bicinchoninic is an organic compound with the formula (C9H5NCO2H)2. The molecule consists of a pair of  quinoline rings, each bearing a carboxylic acid group.  Its sodium salt forms a purple complex with cuprous ions.

Bicinchoninic acid is most commonly employed in the bicinchoninic acid (BCA) assay, which is used to determine the total level of protein in a solution.  Bicinchoninic acid is used to analyze to monitor cuprous ion presence due to its purple coloration via a biuret reaction. In this assay, two molecules of bicinchoninic acid chelate a single Cu+ ion, forming a purple water-soluble complex that strongly absorbs light at 562 nm.

References

Quinolines
Dicarboxylic acids
Aromatic acids
Dimers (chemistry)